John Stafford Durham (a.k.a. Mark Cromwell, June 8, 1843 – January 12, 1918) served in the Union Army during the American Civil War. He received the Medal of Honor for his actions during the Battle of Perryville.

Biography
Durham was born on June 8, 1843, in New York City, the son of Amos H. Durham and Mary Ann née Laken. He ran away from home at age seven and was adopted by a showman, who changed his name to Mark Cromwell. Durham's official residence was Malone, Wisconsin when he joined the Union Army. He joined the 1st Wisconsin Infantry in August 1861, and mustered out in October 1864. During the Battle of Perryville he took over as the flag bearer for his regiment when the color sergeant was shot. He moved forward with the flag until he was ordered to stop midway by his commanding officer. Durham was admitted to the Soldiers' Home in Leavenworth, Kansas in 1902; he died there on January 12, 1918 and was buried at Leavenworth National Cemetery in Leavenworth. His grave can be found in section 33, row 10, grave 18.

Medal of Honor citation
Rank and organization: Sergeant, Company F, 1st Wisconsin Infantry. Place and date: At Perryville, Ky., 8 October 1862. Entered service at: Malone, Fond du Lac County, Wis. Born: 1843, New York, N.Y. Date of issue: 20 November 1896.

Citation:

For extraordinary heroism on 8 October 1862, while serving with Company F, 1st Wisconsin Infantry, in action at Perryville, Kentucky. Sergeant Durham seized the flag of his regiment when the color sergeant was shot and advanced with the flag midway between the lines, amid a shower of shot, shell, and bullets, until stopped by his commanding officer.

See also

List of Medal of Honor recipients
List of American Civil War Medal of Honor recipients: A–F

References

External links

1843 births
1918 deaths
Military personnel from New York City
People from Fond du Lac County, Wisconsin
United States Army Medal of Honor recipients
Union Army soldiers
Military personnel from Wisconsin
American Civil War recipients of the Medal of Honor